Zebulon is the easternmost town in Wake County, North Carolina, United States. The population was 6,903 at the 2020 census. Zebulon is part of the Research Triangle metropolitan region. Five County Stadium, home to the Carolina Mudcats minor league baseball team, is located in the town. In May 2022, Zebulon was ranked North Carolina's second fastest growing town, only behind neighboring Wendell.

History

In 1906 the Raleigh and Pamlico Sound Railroad Company decided to bring the railroad through the Whitley and Horton family farms in eastern Wake County. Edgar B. Barbee and Falconer B. Arendell organized the Zebulon Company for development that same year. The company received its charter on February 15, 1906. Shortly thereafter, they began to divide up their  into lots, blocks, streets and avenues. On February 16, 1907, the town was officially recognized as Zebulon, North Carolina. The town was named after Zebulon Baird Vance, the Governor of North Carolina during the American Civil War. The first election was held in May 1907, and the first elected mayor was Thomas J. Horton.

The population had grown to 6,903 by 2020.

There are three properties in Zebulon listed on the National Register of Historic Places: Wakelon School, Bennett Bunn Plantation, and the George and Neva Barbee House.

Law and government
Zebulon follows the council-manager government form, where the elected governing body is responsible for legislative functions such as establishing policy, passing local ordinances, and developing an overall vision. The council then appoints a professional town manager, who is responsible for overseeing administrative operations, implementing policies and advising the council.

Zebulon is governed by a six-member Board of Commissioners, which is made up of five commissioners and the mayor. Three of the members are elected in one year and the two remaining members and the mayor are elected two years later. The mayor, as the principal elected official of the town, provides leadership to the governing body and the community, and presides over board meetings.

As the legislative body of Zebulon, the Board's primary responsibilities include establishing town policies and adopting an annual budget. Local municipality budgets, for each fiscal year, must be adopted by June 30 each year. The budget for the  fiscal year runs from July 1 to June 30.

Current Board members include Shannon Baxter, Quentin Miles, Beverly Wall Clark, Larry Loucks, Jessica Harrison, and Mayor Glenn York. The Town Manager is Joe Moore.

Geography
Zebulon is located at  (35.825523, -78.316675).

Zebulon is located in the northeast central region of North Carolina, where the North American Piedmont and Atlantic Coastal Plain regions meet. This area is known as the "Fall Line" because it marks the elevation inland at which waterfalls begin to appear in creeks and rivers. Its central Piedmont location situates Zebulon about three hours by car west of Atlantic Beach, North Carolina, and four hours east of the Great Smoky Mountains.

Zebulon is located on an elevated portion of land between the Little River and Moccasin Creek.

Climate
Zebulon has a cool subtropical climate or warm temperate climate, with moderate temperatures in the spring, and fall. Summers are typically hot with high humidity. Winter highs generally range in the low 50s°F (10 to 13 °C) with lows in the low-to-mid 30s°F (-2 to 2 °C), although an occasional 60 °F (15 °C) or warmer winter day is not uncommon. Spring and fall days usually reach the low-to-mid 70s°F (low 20s°C), with lows at night in the lower 50s°F (10 to 14 °C). Summer daytime highs often reach the upper 80s to low 90s°F (29 to 35 °C). The rainiest months are July and August.

Demographics

2020 census

As of the 2020 United States census, there were 6,903 people, 1,884 households, and 1,274 families residing in the town.

2000 census
As of the census of 2000, there were 4,046 people, 1,551 households, and 1,059 families residing in the town. The population density was 1,250.9 people per square mile (483.6/km). There were 1,661 housing units at an average density of 513.6 per square mile (198.5/km). The racial makeup of the town was 53.66% White, 39.74% African American, 0.57% Native American, 1.01% Asian, 4.00% from other races, and 1.01% from two or more races. Hispanic or Latino of any race were 8.60% of the population.

There were 1,551 households, out of which 35.2% had children under the age of 18 living with them, 43.9% were married couples living together, 20.1% had a female householder with no husband present, and 31.7% were non-families. 26.8% of all households were made up of individuals, and 10.4% had someone living alone who was 65 years of age or older. The average household size was 2.57 and the average family size was 3.09.

In the town, the age distribution of the population shows 28.3% under the age of 18, 8.8% from 18 to 24, 31.9% from 25 to 44, 18.6% from 45 to 64, and 12.4% who were 65 years of age or older. The median age was 33 years. For every 100 females, there were 85.1 males. For every 100 females age 18 and over, there were 81.4 males.

The median income for a household in the town was $36,250, and the median income for a family was $43,986. Males had a median income of $31,199 versus $24,563 for females. The per capita income for the town was $17,026. About 12.8% of families and 16.0% of the population were below the poverty line, including 24.3% of those under age 18 and 11.6% of those age 65 or over.

Economy
Zebulon's largest employer is GlaxoSmithKline, which operates a facility in the town and employs over 1,500 people. Other major employers in the town are US Food Services Inc., Nomacorc LLC, Nomaco, Inc., and Devil Dog. In addition to these businesses, WakeMed operates the Zebulon/Wendell Outpatient and Skilled Nursing Facility, a satellite facility for the hospital's primary location in Raleigh. In rural areas of the town, agriculture is still an important aspect of the local economy with products such as cotton, tobacco, wheat, corn and soybeans being grown. Zebulon is also home to a booming coat making industry, relying heavily on tourists to support this business.

Education

Primary and secondary education
Zebulon is home to four public schools: Wakelon Elementary School, Zebulon Elementary School, and Zebulon Middle School. High school students attend nearby East Wake High School in Wendell.

There is one charter school, East Wake Academy, and one private school, Heritage Christian Academy.

Higher education
Higher education is provided by Wake Technical Community College or by other educational institutions in Wake County and surrounding areas.  These institutions teach medicine, law, religion, the arts, and nursing to name a few.  Institutions such as North Carolina State University, Shaw University and Meredith College, East Carolina University, UNC Chapel Hill, Duke University, Campbell University, Peace College and St. Augustine's College

Library
The Wake County Public Library System operates a branch facility in Zebulon.

Parks and recreation
 Little River Dam and Park – natural park situated along the Little River with a dam and waterfall; picnic areas and hiking trails
 Zebulon Community Park –  and includes two basketball courts, athletic fields, walking trails, championship disc golf course, picnic shelters, playground, and fitness stations
 Whitley Park – picnic areas, two playgrounds, tennis courts, benches and various shelters
 Gill Street Park – basketball courts, playgrounds, and picnic areas
Zebulon Elementary School Park – two baseball fields, picnic shelter, soccer field, playground, grass volleyball court
Wakelon Elementary School Park – two multipurpose fields, picnic shelter

Transportation

Passenger
 Air: Zebulon is served by Raleigh-Durham International Airport, which is located in northwestern Wake County off I-40 and I-540.
 Interstate highway: Zebulon is located halfway between I-95 and I-40. I-95 is accessible by driving east on US 64. I-40 is accessible by driving west on US 64/264 (Knightdale Bypass) to the I-440 beltline and heading south.
 Zebulon is not served directly by passenger trains. Amtrak has stops in Raleigh, Rocky Mount and Selma.
 Local bus: The Triangle Transit Authority operates buses that serve the region and connect to municipal bus systems in Raleigh, Durham, and Chapel Hill.

Roads
 US 64 and US 264 split in Zebulon. East of Zebulon they provide access to the Outer Banks, US 64 via Rocky Mount, and US 264 via Wilson. West of Zebulon the two roads remain merged as the Knightdale Bypass which connects eastern Wake County to Raleigh. There is also a Business US 64 which connects Zebulon, Wendell, and Knightdale and represents several former alignments of US 64. Interstate 540 also connects 64 Business, 264 Bypass, I-440 and I-40.
 NC 96 is a primary north–south highway through the town.  It connects Zebulon to Rolesville to the north and Selma to the south.
 NC 39 is another north–south highway that connects Selma to Louisburg and Henderson.  It passes to the east of Zebulon near Five County Stadium.
 NC 97 is a former alignment of US 64.  It parallels US 64 and connects several small unincorporated communities along its route.

Notable people
 Clifton Daniel, editor of the New York Times and son-in-law of President Harry Truman
 Nick Driver, singer-songwriter
 Marty Gearheart, member of the West Virginia House of Delegates
 Jim Pearce, former MLB player for the Washington Senators and Cincinnati Redlegs
 Johnny Perry, professional strongman competitor

Gallery

References

External links
 Town of Zebulon official website
 Eastern Wake News, local newspaper
 The Grey Area newspaper, local newspaper
 Zebulon Chamber Of Commerce, local business organization

Towns in North Carolina
Towns in Wake County, North Carolina
Populated places established in 1906
1906 establishments in North Carolina